The Somali goat is a goat breed from Somalia, Djibouti and northeast Kenya used primarily for the production of meat. The animals have short ears and hair, usually white but sometimes with spots or patches. Both males and females have horns, although females are often  polled. The goats are drought tolerant and, when milked, can each yield one to three kilograms of milk daily, even when access to water is limited.

See also
Somali sheep

References

Goat breeds
Meat goat breeds
Goat breeds originating in Somalia
Goat breeds originating in Kenya